Larry Donnell "Donnie" Andrews (April 29, 1954 – December 13, 2012) was an American armed robber, murderer, and anti-crime advocate. He was one of the inspirations for the character Omar Little on the HBO series The Wire.

Early life
Andrews grew up in a housing project in West Baltimore, Maryland. He was physically abused by his mother. At the age of 9, he witnessed a man being beaten to death over 15 cents.

Life of crime 
Andrews became an armed robber who robbed drug dealers, but his code of ethics included never involving women nor children. He was known to police for armed robbery and drug dealing in the 1970s and early 1980s in Baltimore. In 1986, local drug kingpin Warren Boardley convinced Andrews (who needed to support his heroin addiction) and Reggie Gross to take on the contract killing of Zachary Roach and Rodney "Touche" Young. Filled with guilt, Andrews surrendered himself to Ed Burns, a homicide detective with the Baltimore Police Department. Working with Burns, he agreed to wear a covert listening device, which he used to implicate Boardley and Gross in the killings.

In 1987, Andrews was sentenced to life in prison for the two murders. He was denied parole on his first attempts, but continued to study, ended his addiction to heroin, and helped other inmates by running an anti-gang workshop.

While Andrews was in prison, Detective Burns introduced him to Fran Boyd, whose family was prominently featured in The Corner: A Year in the Life of an Inner-City Neighborhood, a 1997 book by Burns and David Simon. Andrews and Boyd's first conversation came in January 1993, when Boyd was still using drugs. Andrews encouraged Boyd to get clean.

Andrews was paroled from prison in 2005.

The Wire 
By 1998, Burns and Simon, as well as the lead prosecutor who obtained Andrews' conviction, began to lobby for Andrews' release from prison. While Andrews was in prison, Simon sent him copies of the newspaper, and Andrews gave Simon information about crimes taking place in Baltimore. Simon named Andrews a consultant on The Wire, an HBO show about crime in Baltimore which ran from 2002 to 2008. Simon used Andrews as one of the inspirations for the character Omar Little, a stickup artist who never targeted innocent bystanders.

Andrews was released from prison in 2005. He performed youth outreach after his release from prison. His foundation, Why Murder?, attempted to steer children away from a life of crime.

He portrayed Donnie on The Wire, an associate of Omar and his advisor Butchie.

Personal life 
Andrews and Fran Boyd married on August 11, 2007. Wedding guests included Simon and The Wire cast members Dominic West, Sonja Sohn, and Andre Royo.

Andrews suffered from an aortic dissection, from which he died on December 13, 2012 in Manhattan, New York. He was 58 years old.

References

1954 births
2012 deaths
People from Baltimore
The Wire
American people convicted of murder
American activists